Le Scienze (The Sciences) is an Italian monthly science magazine, It is the Italian edition of Scientific American.

History and profile
Published monthly since 1968, Le Scienze was founded by industrial Alberto Mondadori and scientist Felice Ippolito. The magazine is part of Gruppo Editoriale L'Espresso and is published on a monthly basis.

Le Scienze covers both high-rank American scientific results as well as Italian (and sometimes European) contributions to research. Among regular contributors to the magazine are Piergiorgio Odifreddi and Tullio Regge. The current director is Marco Cattaneo.

In 2007, the circulation of Le Scienze was 62,950 copies. It was 66,000 copies in 2010.

See also
List of magazines published in Italy

References

External links
 (in Italian)

1968 establishments in Italy
GEDI Gruppo Editoriale
Italian-language magazines
Magazines established in 1968
Magazines published in Milan
Monthly magazines published in Italy
Science and technology magazines
Scientific American